The "Vizcaya Hymn" is the official anthem of the province of Nueva Vizcaya in the Philippines.

History
The Vizcaya Hymn was composed by Jaime M. Macadangdang, a retired teacher from Solano, who also wrote the song's original English lyrics.

In 2012, the Sangguniang Panlalawigan of Nueva Vizcaya passed Ordinance No. 2012-081, adopting new, official Ilocano lyrics for the song, with Macadangdang's lyrics being translated into Ilocano by Benjamin Tucay. Intended to make the song more relatable to the province's residents, the provincial government subsequently ordered all employees of the province's subordinate local government units to sing the song in Ilocano, and the ordinance made mandatory the song's performance at official events and public functions throughout the province.

The Sangguniang Panlalawigan later passed Ordinance No. 2019–160 on June 17, 2019 which adopts an official flag for Nueva Vizcaya, with the playing of the Vizcaya Hymn becoming part of the observed flag protocol whenever it is raised.

Lyrics
Although the Vizcaya Hymn only has official lyrics in English and Ilocano, indigenous peoples living in the province have also translated the lyrics into their own respective languages.

The song's lyrics make reference to the natural beauty of the province, its rich natural resources, and the need to love, encourage and promote the province's cultural traditions.

References

External links
, produced by the Nueva Vizcaya State University

Regional songs
Culture of Nueva Vizcaya
English-language Filipino songs
Asian anthems
Philippine anthems